16S rRNA (uracil1498-N3)-methyltransferase (DUF558 protein, YggJ, RsmE, m3U1498 specific methyltransferase) is an enzyme with systematic name S-adenosyl-L-methionine:16S rRNA (uracil1498-N3)-methyltransferase. This enzyme catalyses the following chemical reaction

 S-adenosyl-L-methionine + uracil1498 in 16S rRNA  S-adenosyl-L-homocysteine + N3-methyluracil1498 in 16S rRNA

The enzyme specifically methylates uracil1498 at N3 in 16S rRNA.

References

External links 

EC 2.1.1